Diagnosis for Death is the debut album by American horror punk band Dr. Chud's X-Ward, released in 2004 on Dr. Chud's Bloodwork Records label.

The first 1,000 copies of the album were limited edition and were signed, numbered and came with a free vinyl sticker. In 2005, it was released on purple vinyl; only 1,250 copies were released.

The video for the song "Powerless" was filmed in Zounds Rehearsal Studios in Saddebrook, New Jersey.

Track listing
 Powerless (also a video which was included on the release)
 Mommy Made Luv 2 an Alien (also a video which was included on the release) 
 Heavy Metal 
 Spiderbaby  
 Blue Skin  
 Goodbye 
 Rabid  
 Bury You Alive

2004 albums
Dr. Chud's X-Ward albums